They Met in a Taxi is a 1936 American comedy film directed by Alfred E. Green and starring Chester Morris, Fay Wray and Raymond Walburn. It was produced and distributed by Columbia Pictures.

Cast

References

Bibliography
 Roy Kinnard & Tony Crnkovich. The Films of Fay Wray. McFarland, 2005.

External links
 

1936 films
1936 comedy films
American comedy films
Films directed by Alfred E. Green
Columbia Pictures films
American black-and-white films
1930s English-language films
1930s American films